Newstead Wood School is a selective girls' grammar school in Avebury Road, Orpington, south east London, England.

Admissions

The school is a grammar school which admits girls in Year 7 based on the results of a selection test, also known as the 11+. The current head teacher is Alan Blount. The school's motto is Fortitudine Crescamus (Latin for: 'May we grow in strength'). The school has been  admitting boys into the sixth form since 2012.

History
The school was founded as Orpington Grammar School for Girls in 1957, when administered by the Kent Education Committee. In 1965, as a result of the London Government Act 1963, the local area, and thus the school, came under the authority of the London Borough of Bromley. It was at this point that the school's name was changed to Newstead Wood School. Nearby Bullers Wood School became a comprehensive in the late 1970s, and most schools in the borough are now comprehensive. There were firm plans for Newstead Wood School to become comprehensive in 1978, but the school has remained one of the only two selective state schools in Bromley. As a result, it is heavily oversubscribed.

In 1997, a survey in the Sunday Times found that the school was the best value in England for each A or B grade achieved at A-level, second to St Olave's school; Bromley was a low spender (per pupil) comparative to other LEAs. In 2004, a pupil gained the best result at Maths GCSE in England. In 2009 the headteacher told the conference in Harrogate of the Girls' Schools Association that schools were not concentrating on brighter pupils, instead trying to raise average pupils' grades from D to C, and that girls in mixed-sex schools can have their ambitions crushed and be held back in male-dominated professions (girls from single-sex schools are statistically more successful in science-based professions than from mixed schools). She also criticised a government scheme to give one-to-one tuition to less able pupils, and not more-able students, when considering the lack of women in traditionally-male occupations, and she claimed there was a 'huge reluctance' to concentrate on top students.

On 1 April 2011, the school gained academy status and is now sponsored by United Learning.

Academic performance
At its last full inspection in 2022, Newstead Wood was rated by Ofsted as Outstanding,. The school has a large catchment area of nine miles, from which pupils are selected on the basis of tests in verbal and non-verbal reasoning.

The school was ranked third amongst secondary schools in Bromley based on overall performance at end of key stage 4 in 2019 - all pupils on the Progress 8 benchmark.

Times Parent Power  has ranked the School's 2019 A-level results 121st in the country (previous year 161st) and 2019 GCSE results 11th (previous year 15th) and also ranks it 11th amongst all secondary schools in Greater London.

Entrance examinations
There are currently two examinations required to gain a place at the school: verbal and non-verbal reasoning.

Notable former pupils

 Dina Asher-Smith, multi Olympic and World Championship medallist
 Gemma Chan, actress known for her role as Astrid in Crazy Rich Asians, and as Anita/Mia on the television drama Humans
 Samantha Baines, actress and comedian
 Suzi Brent, blogger and author
 Leela Bunce
 Libby Jackson, space exploration expert, author and former controller and flight director for the Columbus Module, the European module of the International Space Station.
 Emma Johnson, clarinettist, winner of the 1984 BBC Young Musician of the Year, and Bronze in the Eurovision Young Musicians 1984
 Liv Little, Editor in Chief and Founder of gal dem magazine
 Josie Long, comedian
 Kim Medcalf, actress who played Sam Mitchell (EastEnders) from 2002 to 2005 and from 2022 onwards
 Emma Raducanu, British tennis player and 2021 US Open Champion
 Josephine Vander Gucht - part of the duet Oh Wonder
 Barbara Harriss-White, Professor of Development Studies at the University of Oxford

Orpington Grammar School for Girls
 Christine Hancock, general secretary from 1989 to 2001 of the Royal College of Nursing

References

External links
 Newstead Wood School website
 Alumni
 EduBase

Academies in the London Borough of Bromley
Grammar schools in the London Borough of Bromley
Girls' schools in London
Educational institutions established in 1957
1957 establishments in England
Orpington
United Learning schools
Specialist engineering colleges in England